Julian Gilbey is a British film director, editor and screenwriter. He is known for his work on horror films, also appearing in these as the actor, and performing many other roles on many of those movies.

Biography
Gilbey began his movie career in the 2000s with the low-budget 2002 horror film Reckoning Day, working on the project as director, screenwriter, actor, cinematographer, editor, make-up artist and costume designer. In 2006 he wrote, directed and edited the crime drama Rollin' With The Nines. Gilbey wrote, directed and edited Rise of the Footsoldier in 2007. In 2009 he worked as editor on Jake West's comedy horror film Doghouse.

In 2011 he directed and edited survival thriller A Lonely Place to Die, co-written with his brother Will Gilbey.

In 2013 Gilbey directed the international thriller Plastic, that he co-wrote with Will Gilbey and Chris Howard.

In 2014 he directed a short film segment for "The ABC's of Death 2."

In 2018 he directed the drama film Summit Fever starring Freddie Thorp and Emma Tachard-Mackey.

Personal life
His great-grandfather was British actor Nigel Bruce and his brother Will is a screenwriter.

Filmography
 Reckoning Day (2000)
 Rollin' With The Nines (2005)
 Rise of the Footsoldier (2007)
 A Lonely Place to Die (2010)
 Plastic (2013) - Director/Editor/Writer
 Summit Fever (2022)

References

External links
 

1978 births
Living people
British male film actors
British film directors
British film editors
British cinematographers
British costume designers